

Plants

Angiosperms

Arthropods

Insects

Archosauromorphs

Phytosaurs

Dinosaurs
Data courtesy of George Olshevsky's dinosaur genera list.

Synapsids

Pelycosaurs

Eutherians

Cetaceans

References

1950s in paleontology
Paleontology
Paleontology 4